Ramkrishna Mahabhidyalay , is a general degree college affiliated with Tripura University, (A Central University), located in Kailashahar, Tripura. It is the second oldest college in Tripura, established in the year 1950. This college provides Savarel Undergraduate courses and also offers two postgraduate courses from 2022.

The founder of the College, Tapas Chaitanya Maharaj, wished to transmit to society the ideals of Sri Ramkrishna Paramhamsa Dev and Swami Vivekananda. Dr. Sachchidananda Dhar was the founder principal of the college. Initially, the college offered only arts courses, but later Science and Commerce streams were added. The college was privately owned for more than thirty years. After that, the government took over the college in 1982.

Enumeration 

This college is made up of total 5 buildings, the number of rooms is 55 out of which 30 are classrooms. This college has 5 office rooms and staff rooms.  There are 20 additional rooms. A separate science department of the college was inaugurated on October 14, 2022, by Chief Minister Dr. By Manik Saha.  Teachers, students, and dignitaries attended the ceremony, including Hon'ble Minister for Social Welfare and Social Education Santana Chakma.

Courses and subjects 

Bachalors of science 
 Mathematics
 Physics
 Chemistry
 Botany
 Zoology
 Physiology
 Computer Sc.

 Bachalors of Arts 
Bengali
Pol.Science
History
Education
Philosophy
Economics
Sanskrit
Pali
Hindi
Music
Physical
Education

 Bachalors of commerce 
 Commerce
<br/ >

See also
Education in India
Education in Tripura
Tripura University
Literacy in India
List of institutions of higher education in Tripura

References

External links

Universities and colleges in Tripura
Colleges affiliated to Tripura University
Unakoti district
Educational institutions established in 1950
1950 establishments in India
Colleges in Tripura